= IRFU =

IRFU or Irfu may refer to:

- Irish Rugby Football Union, The Irish rugby football union (IRFU), is the national rugby association of Ireland
- Interprovincial Rugby Football Union, a four-team league that merged with the Western Interprovincial Rugby Football Union (WIFU) to create the Canadian Football League
